Scott Murray may refer to:

Scott Murray (rugby union) (born 1976), Scottish international rugby union footballer
Scott Murray (rugby league, born 1972), Australian rugby league player
Scott Murray (rugby league, Penrith), Australian rugby league player
Scott Murray (footballer, born 1974), Scottish footballer (Bristol City)
Scott Murray (footballer, born 1988), Scottish footballer (Dundee, Partick Thistle)
Scott Murray (filmmaker), Australian filmmaker and writer
Scott W. Murray (born 1954), American attorney